In flagrante delicto (Latin for "in blazing offence") or sometimes simply in flagrante ("in blazing") is a legal term used to indicate that a criminal has been caught in the act of committing an offence (compare ). The colloquial "caught red-handed" and "caught rapid" are English equivalents.

Aside from the legal meaning, the Latin term is often used colloquially as a euphemism for someone being caught in the midst of sexual activity.

Etymology 
The phrase combines the present active participle flagrāns (flaming or blazing) with the noun dēlictum (offence, misdeed, or crime). In this term the Latin preposition in, not indicating motion, takes the ablative. The closest literal translation would be "in blazing offence", where "blazing" is a metaphor for vigorous, highly visible action.

Worldwide

Latin America 
In many Latin American countries, being caught in flagrante is a common legal requirement for both detention and search and seizure. Naturally, being caught in flagrante makes convictions easier to obtain; in some jurisdictions where the police are not adept at investigation and the use of forensic science is not widespread, it may be difficult to get a conviction any other way. On occasion, governments with such constitutional requirements have been accused of stretching the definition of in flagrante in order to carry out illegal arrests. In Brazil, a member of the National Congress cannot be arrested unless caught in flagrante delicto of a non-bailable crime, and whether or not a member's detention should continue is decided by their parliamentary peers.

Japan 
In Japan, the phrase's translation, is used to refer to citizen's arrest, and is listed under Section 213 of the Code of Criminal Procedure as such.

See also
 Probable cause
 Smoking gun

References

External links

Latin legal terminology
Sexual slang